Shamima Akter Liza (born 1989) is a Bangladeshi chess player and FIDE Woman International Master. She has won the Bangladesh Women's Chess Championship in 2005, 2010 and 2014.

Career
Liza has qualified for the Women's World Chess Championship 2014. In 2014 Liza finished 66th in 28th Cannes Winter Chess Festival in Cannes, France.

References

External links 
 
 

1989 births
Living people
Bangladeshi female chess players
Chess Woman International Masters
Place of birth missing (living people)
Chess players at the 2006 Asian Games
Chess players at the 2010 Asian Games
Asian Games competitors for Bangladesh